The Center Won't Hold is the ninth studio album by American rock band Sleater-Kinney, released on August 16, 2019 by Mom + Pop Music. The album was produced by St. Vincent and is the last album with drummer Janet Weiss, who announced her departure from the band on July 1, 2019, a month before the album was released. Upon release, the album received generally favorable reviews from critics.

Recording and release
By January 2018, the band was said to be working on their follow-up to No Cities to Love, though Carrie Brownstein has said that they're "going to do this very slowly". Carrie Brownstein suggested to Jeff Tweedy that he produce some songs with the band but they began working with St. Vincent first and they enjoyed working with her so much that they decided to continue with her. In January 2019, the band announced that a new album would be expected the same year, produced by St. Vincent.

Singles
"Hurry On Home" was released as the album's lead single on May 29, 2019. The band performed the song on The Tonight Show Starring Jimmy Fallon on June 19, 2019. "Can I Go On" serves as the second single, impacting Triple A radio on August 5, 2019. A promotional single, "The Future Is Here", was released on June 14, 2019. The title track was released as the second promotional single on July 17, 2019.

Composition
With The Center, Sleater-Kinney was credited with adding the explicit "artiness" of post-punk "to their punk roar." It is also seen as a "sleek [and] sharp" fusion of industrial music and synth-pop.

Critical reception

 The A.V. Club included "Hurry On Home" as part of its list of the 30 best queer rock tracks of 2019 and reviewer Katie Rife gave it a positive assessment, writing: "Sleek and shredded, the song bears the stamp of producer St. Vincent, whose slinky sexiness collides with Sleater-Kinney’s heavy riffage with all the power—and entertainment value—of Godzilla battling King Kong."

Upon the album's release, Rife praised the relevance of the songwriting and St. Vincent's production. Comparing The Center Won't Hold to the band's previous albums, The Fader called the album a "beastlier-sounding record than any of those, with wide-open expanses full of slime and bile and some of the band’s most vicious lyrics, blown up to occupy every part of the mix". In Uncut, Sharon O'Connell called it "furiously, vitally Sleater-Kinney". Caryn Rose, writing for Pitchfork, described the production as standing out from the rest of the band's discography, but still keeping the elements they are known for. While ambivalent about St. Vincent's "polished" arty production, Robert Christgau gave the album an A-minus and observed a hooky "musical efficiency" throughout, along with allusive political content "from its Yeatsian opener to a closer that invokes both #MeToo and Hillary '16 if you want it to".

Kate Hutchinson of The Observer was less positive, suggesting that Sleater-Kinney is trying too hard, when they "have always felt effortless". Writing for Tiny Mix Tapes, Jeremy Klein gave a mixed review, with a score of three out of five, calling the collaboration with St. Vincent ultimately disappointing and calling the band "lost" while giving a positive reception to several tracks.

Track listing
All tracks written by Sleater-Kinney (Corin Tucker, Janet Weiss and Carrie Brownstein).
"The Center Won't Hold" – 3:04
"Hurry On Home" – 2:48
"Reach Out" – 3:30
"Can I Go On" – 3:30
"Restless" – 2:41
"Ruins" – 5:18
"Love" – 2:16
"Bad Dance" – 2:45
"The Future Is Here" – 3:00
"The Dog/The Body" – 4:22
"Broken" – 3:02

Personnel
Sleater-Kinney
Carrie Brownstein – guitar, vocals, piano on "Broken"
Corin Tucker – guitar, vocals
Janet Weiss – drums

Technical personnel
 Tom Elmhirst – mixing
 Cian Riordan – engineering
 St. Vincent – production

Artwork
 Clare Byrne – styling
 Charlie Engman – photography
 Humberto Leon – creative direction
 João Moraes/Framework – art direction
 Tina Outen – hair
 Brian Phillips – creative direction
 Kanako Takase – makeup
 McLayne Ycmat – design

Charts

Album

Singles

References

External links

Song Exploder episode on "The Future Is Here"

2019 albums
Albums produced by St. Vincent (musician)
Mom + Pop Music albums
Sleater-Kinney albums
Industrial albums by American artists